Kay Keavney (1921–1989) was an Australian writer.

She was born in Sydney and completed a Bachelor of Arts at the University of Sydney. She went to work at the ABC, the youngest person and the first woman to be hired as a scriptwriter by that organisation. She resigned from the ABC in 1945.

In the late 1940s she wrote serials and plays for various networks and production companies and became one of the leading writers of Australian radio.

She went to London to study writing TV drama at the BBC and wrote episodes of The Adventures of Long John Silver.
She won two Walkley Awards for her journalism.

Select Credits
Mantle of Greatness (1948) (radio play)
A Tale of Christmas (1954) (television play)
The Adventures of Long John Silver (1955) (TV series) – writer of various episodes
Eye of the Night (1960) (television play)
The Barber (1962) – novel
The Nurse's Story (1962) (documentary)
The Story of Peter Grey (1962) (TV mini series)
Prelude to Harvest (1963) (television play)
The Nylon Trap (1963) radio serial
Skippy (1968–70) (TV series) – writer of various episodes

References

External links

Kay Keavney at AustLit
Kay Keavney at National Film and Sound Archive

Australian writers
1921 births
1989 deaths
Australian expatriates in the United Kingdom